Zhangixalus moltrechti is a species of frog in the family Rhacophoridae. It is endemic to Taiwan, where it has a wide distribution in hilly areas. Common names Moltrecht's green treefrog, Moltrecht's treefrog, Taiwan treefrog, and Nantou flying frog have been coined for it.

Etymology
The specific name moltrechti honors , a Latvian entomologist, lepidopterist, and ophthalmologist; while stationed in Vladivostok he also traveled and collected in Taiwan.

Description
The finger and toe tips have well-developed discs. Skin is smooth. The overall coloration is green; some individuals have few white spots. The belly is white yellow. The hidden surfaces of the hind legs are red or orange with black spots. The iris is orange red.

Habitat and conservation
Zhangixalus moltrechti occurs in forests, orchards, and tea plantations at elevations below . Breeding takes place in bodies of standing water, such as ponds, pools, cisterns, and blocked roadside ditches. It may also breed in pools of intermittent streams, potholes, and streamside pools. High-elevation (~) populations breed in spring and summer (April–September), whereas low-elevation (<) populations breed in late autumn to early spring (October–March); mid-elevation populations breed throughout the year, with peak in spring. The eggs are laid in foam nests above the water, attached to branches of trees, bushes, or walls.

Zhangixalus moltrechti  is a common and adaptable species that is not facing significant threats. It occurs in several protected areas.

See also
List of protected species in Taiwan
List of endemic species of Taiwan

References 

moltrechti
Amphibians of Taiwan
Endemic fauna of Taiwan
Amphibians described in 1908
Taxa named by George Albert Boulenger
Taxonomy articles created by Polbot